Pontiac Township may refer to the following townships in the United States:

 Pontiac Township, Livingston County, Illinois
 Pontiac Township, Michigan